Adrorhizon purpurascens is a species of orchid (family Orchidaceae). It is the only species in the genus Adrorhizon and one of three genera in the subtribe Adrorhizinae.

The genus is native to southern India and Sri Lanka.

References 

Orchid Species

Adrorhizinae
Orchids of India
Orchids of Sri Lanka
Vandeae genera
Monotypic Epidendroideae genera
Taxa named by Joseph Dalton Hooker